Kangaroo meat is produced in Australia from wild kangaroos and is exported to over 60 overseas markets.

Kangaroo meat is sourced from species of kangaroos that are harvested in the wild.  Kangaroo harvesting only occurs in approved harvest zones, and quotas are set to ensure the sustainability of kangaroo populations. However, the accuracy of the methods used to estimate kangaroos population numbers is highly disputed. If numbers approach minimum thresholds harvest zones are closed until populations recover. The kangaroos harvesting industry claims that kangaroos are harvested by licensed shooters in accordance with a strict code of practice to ensure high standards of both humaneness and food hygiene. However, there is growing evidence that demonstrates the industry cannot be regulated because the animals are shot at night from the wild. In October 2022, the RSPCA announced it is withdrawing products containing kangaroo meat from its shelves due to “concerns about animal welfare implications in the sourcing of these products”  Meat that is exported is inspected by the Australian Quarantine and Inspection Service (AQIS). In 1981, the Australian meat substitution scandal revealed that kangaroo meat intentionally mislabeled as beef had been exported to the United States and other countries.

The kangaroo has been historically a staple source of protein for indigenous Australians. Kangaroo meat is very high in protein and very low in fat (about 2%). Kangaroo meat has a very high concentration of conjugated linoleic acid (CLA) when compared with other foods. CLA has been attributed with a wide range of health benefits.  Kangaroo meat is also processed into pet food.  Due to its low fat content, kangaroo meat cannot be cooked in the same way as other red meats, and is typically either slow cooked or quickly stir-fried.

RSPCA Bans the Sale of Kangaroo Meat due to ‘Animal Welfare Concerns’
In October 2022, the RSPCA announced it is withdrawing products containing kangaroo meat from its shelves due to “concerns about animal welfare implications in the sourcing of these products” 

Think Tank for Kangaroos (THINKK) suggested that, “although the RSPCA assessment of shooters (in 1985 & 2002) showed 98% accuracy this was affected by observer bias, whereas some research by individuals that has involved sampling of carcasses has found as many as 40% of animals may have been miss-shot (not killed by a single headshot)” 

Since that report, the RSPCA’s deep concerns about animal welfare and ethics in the industry was clearly demonstrated when in 2021 they recommended that kangaroo shooters “wear body cameras” “so the industry can demonstrate compliance with the commercial code given the limited resources to physically monitor shooting locations at night”.  “The RSPCA argued that the current system does not allow verification of whether kangaroos have been killed with a headshot because kangaroos that are injured or escape may not be reported and the heads of the animals are removed in the field.”

Production
Kangaroo meat is sourced from species of kangaroos that are harvested in the wild. This policy has been criticised by some animal rights activists. On the other hand, the kangaroo harvest is supported by a wide range of professional ecologists in Australia.  Groups such as the Ecological Society of Australia, the Australasian Wildlife Management Society and the Australian Mammal Society have stated their support for kangaroo harvesting.  Such groups argue that basing agricultural production systems on native animals rather than introduced livestock like sheep offers considerable ecological advantages to the fragile Australian rangelands and could save greenhouse gas emissions.

Though it is impossible to determine the exact number, government conservation agencies in each state calculate population estimates each year. Nearly 40 years of refinement has led to the development of sophisticated aerial survey techniques which enable overall populations estimates to be constructed.  Populations of the large kangaroo species in the commercial harvest zones across Australia vary from approximately 25 to 50 million kangaroos at any given point in time. 

Kangaroos are protected by legislation in Australia, both state and federal. Kangaroo harvesting only occurs in approved harvest zones and quotas are set to ensure the sustainability of kangaroo populations. If numbers approach minimum thresholds harvest zones are closed until populations recover. 

Harvest quotas are set by state or territory governments but all commercial harvest plans must be approved by the Australian Government. Only approved species can be harvested and these include: red kangaroo (Macropus rufus), western grey kangaroo (Macropus fuliginosus), eastern grey kangaroo (Macropus giganteus), and common wallaroo (Macropus robustus). Sustainable use quotas are typically between 10 and 20% of estimated kangaroo populations. Total populations are estimated by aerial surveys and a decade of previous data and quota numbers are calculated by government and science organisations to ensure sustainability. Even though quotas are established by each state, very rarely does actual culling reach 35% of the total quotas allowed. For instance, "[i]n the 2015 harvest period, 25.9% of the commercial harvest quota (for Queensland) was utilised".

Inaccurate Assessment of Kangaroo Population Numbers

The kangaroo population data used to determine the numbers of kangaroos that can be harvested is extremely flawed. The numbers are so over-inflated that it is not actually biologically possible for kangaroos to breed at these rates, demonstrating that the data used to determine kangaroo population numbers is not scientifically sound.

Additionally, the 2019 to 2020 bushfires caused the loss of an estimated 3 billion vertebrate native animals. This monumental loss is compounded by the severe threats from drought, land clearing, urban sprawl, invasive introduced species, and the immense number of wildlife killed by vehicle strikes every year – these factors are also not considered when population numbers are estimated.

Victorian Kangaroo Alliance states; “Independent scientists have long been raising the alarm that government statistics are deeply flawed (that) for example, DELWP estimated 7000 kangaroos on the Mornington Peninsula and yet a rigorous count on the ground overseen by Dr Greg Holland found only 2200. The quotas are based on the government’s estimates regardless of how incorrect they are. (Also that) The most recent Victorian count in 2021 showed a 40% increase in kangaroos over 2 years, which, even if we hadn’t had drought and catastrophic bushfires, would be double the biologically possible rate of increase” 

When commenting on the accuracy of kangaroo population numbers for ‘harvesting’, Honorary Associate Professor David Brooks (University of Sydney) in 2022 stated:

“The basic data from which population estimates are determined is gathered through aerial surveys ... An aircraft flies low over a portion of a zone, sweeping methodically back and forth so as to cover as much of the area as deemed necessary to provide a reliable indication of overall population That the number of kangaroos counted from the air is not the number of kangaroos on the ground” 

(He continues to say) “In order to compensate for kangaroos thus missed, a correction factor is applied to the number of kangaroos actually seen. A factor of (multiplication by) 2.0, for example, would mean that, for every kangaroo seen, it is assumed there is one further kangaroo not seen; a correction factor of 3.0 would suggest that, for every kangaroo seen, there are a further two who have not been seen. The correction factor varies according to terrain. Depending upon terrain and other factors, seven kangaroos seen, when it comes to setting a figure on paper, may become fourteen, or twenty-one, etc.” 

Associate Professor Brooks continues to demonstrate how these population number estimates can therefore be easily grossly overestimated. For example, the 508 wallaroos counted in the Northern Tablelands survey area in 2019, adjusted by a correction factor of 1.85 and with certain minor accommodations made for varying terrain, etc., became an estimated wallaroo population of 296,555 for the 48,000 square kilometre Northern Tablelands Kangaroo Management Zone, a figure 583 times larger (as some commentators have pointed out) than the number of wallaroos actually sighted in a survey of little more than one quarter (0.28) of one percent of the total area of the zone. 

In addition to this, Brooks continues to also demonstrate that these methods of population counting go against biology and science. For example, the decline in eastern grey kangaroo numbers registered in the Cobar area in 2019 are extremely alarming, showing a “drop of 91% from 81,391 in 2018 to 7,317 in 2019” due to drought. Yet, the following year the population is reported to be 45,000 and an increase in the population of 504% - an increase that is biologically not possible 

Associate Professor Brooks continues explain that “Kangaroos breed slowly and have a high juvenile mortality (c.73%), that maximum wild population growth rates average approximately 10% in optimum conditions, with annual declines of up to 60% during drought, and that cull rates even as ‘low’ as 15-20% therefore exceed population growth rates.”  Even in a very good year, a kangaroo population is unlikely to grow at a rate much exceeding 12%, let alone a rate of 200, 400, or even 500% as official tables have stated. 

WIRES, stated:

“Population estimates used to justify annual hunting quotas are inflated and do not take into account the slow reproduction rates of kangaroos. Environmental impacts such as drought, fires and loss of habitat that lead to reductions in numbers of animals as well as non-commercial hunting are not factored into these estimates at all.” 

The Animal Justice Party states, “The commercial kangaroo industry has made kangaroos the victims of the largest slaughter of land-based wildlife on the planet”.

Nutrition and products

The kangaroo has been historically a staple source of protein for indigenous Australians. Kangaroo meat is very high in protein and very low in fat (about 2%). Kangaroo meat has a very high concentration of conjugated linoleic acid (CLA) when compared with other foods. CLA has been attributed with a wide range of health benefits including anti-carcinogenic and anti-diabetes properties, in addition to reducing obesity and atherosclerosis.

While kangaroo meat has enjoyed popularity for its organic nature, little information has been available about its nutrition benefits besides articles dedicated to the value of CLA's.  While basic nutritional data (total protein, fats etc.) are published worldwide, little research has been provided about the nature of the kangaroo protein and its composite amino acid profile. Of the 22 amino acids within protein, nine are vital to human and animal well-being because they can't be manufactured in the body. These are called 'essential amino acids' and the primary research on kangaroo muscle meat nutrition is from a seminal research paper by the primary Australian government science organisation CSIRO in 1970.

Using this research paper as a primary data source essential amino acids have been calculated for dried kangaroo muscle meat (DM) and compared to various other farmed meat sources such as chicken, pork, beef and lamb. By comparison to these farmed meats, kangaroo meat is higher in threonine, isoleucine and valine and lower in arginine and methionine-cystine amino acids. This information is invaluable in calculating balanced diets or when a subject requires an extra natural source of a specific essential amino acid.

Kangaroo meat was legalised for human consumption in South Australia in 1980. In New South Wales, Queensland, and Victoria it could only be sold as pet food until 1993. Kangaroo was once limited in availability, although consumption in Australia is becoming more widespread. However, only 14.5% of Australians were reported in 2008 as eating kangaroo meat at least four times per year. Many Australian supermarkets now stock various cuts of kangaroo including fillets, steaks, minced meat and 'Kanga Bangas' (kangaroo sausages). Many Australian restaurants serve kangaroo meat.

Kangaroo meat has been exported since 1959. Seventy percent of kangaroo meat is exported, particularly to the European market: Germany and France. It is sold in two supermarkets in the United Kingdom and before a suspension on imports of kangaroo meat to Russia in 2009 it was widely used in Russian smallgoods. In 2008, the industry is worth around A$250–270 million a year and provides around 4,000 jobs in Australia.

Kangaroo meat is also processed into pet food.

Cooking
Due to its low fat content (1–2%), kangaroo meat cannot be cooked in the same way as other red meats.  Slow cooking is recommended for kangaroo, or quickly stir-frying.

Animal welfare
The kangaroo meat industry has attracted critical attention in Australia, the United Kingdom and the United States from animal rights organisations. Their concerns centre on the hunting process, in which all kangaroo meat for the global market comes from kangaroos harvested in the wild. In 2009, wildlife ecologist Dr. Dror Ben-Ami for a University of Technology Sydney think-tank estimated that 440,000 "dependent young kangaroos" are bludgeoned or starved to death each year after their mother has been shot. Although, kangaroo harvesters insist that they must follow a strict code of practice to ensure the highest standards of humaneness and the code provides strict guidelines to ensure young aren't left to starve, there is compelling evidence that demonstrates the industry cannot be regulated because the animals are shot at night in the wild.

Kangaroos are not farmed for human or pet food consumption like livestock are - they are shot in the wild at night by commercial shooters. This separates them from the agriculture industry. Evidence shows that they are frequently not killed by the first bullet (up to 40%)  and reports have documented horrific injuries, including cases of jaws being blown off. Due to the uncontrolled conditions of kangaroo ‘harvesting’, these types of injuries are becoming more commonplace. Kangaroos are moving targets, and typically being shot from an unstable platform (e.g. ute/open tray four-wheel drive), and it is therefore a far cry from the controlled stunning of a stationary animal in an abattoir.
When a female kangaroo with a joey is killed, and in instances where the joey is not left to starve, freeze, or die from stress or predation  the joeys are bludgeoned to death by a ‘concussive blow’, and decapitation or cervical dislocation (can be used on joeys without fur)  as a ‘solution’ for disposal, described as a ‘humane’ solution  by the kangaroo meat code of practice. Joeys are waste products of the commercial ‘harvesting’ industry and are also not counted in kill figures 

In reference to the disposal of joeys and in response to the RSPCA’s decision to ban the sale of kangaroo meat at its facilities nationally, ABC News Australia quotes the ‘National Code of Practice for the Shooting of Kangaroos and Wallabies for Commercial purposes, which states:

"The concussive blow must be conducted so that the joey's head is hit against a large solid surface that will not move or compress during the impact (e.g., the tray of a utility vehicle).” 

It is also critical to appreciate that once a gunshot has been fired into a mob of kangaroos, they are going to start panicking and will become extremely flighty, even further decreasing the chance of an accurate lethal head shot to the brain. Joeys at-foot also flee out of fear only to later die of the abovementioned (predation, stress, starvation, or exposure/freezing to death).

It is a misperception and a fallacy that shooters do not kill female kangaroos, reports stating that about 30% of kangaroos killed are female. It is important to appreciate that shooters are undertaking the killing at night, from a distance, and that kangaroos are fast moving and skittish targets. In most cases, it would therefore be almost impossible to accurately determine their gender (also if they are of advanced age or unwell). For example, Honorary Associate Professor David Brooks from the University of Sydney stated:

(That) “As many as one in three kangaroos shot is nevertheless female”. (That) “The industry does take some of these – one presumes only the largest – but most are left in the field. It’s also estimated that at least two in three of females shot have joeys in the pouch, and that at as many of these females shot have an at-foot joey nearby when their killing occurs” 

The Australian Society for Kangaroos reports that:

“...Despite claims by industry representatives that females are no longer targeted by the kangaroo 'harvest' industry, hundreds of thousands of lactating female kangaroos continue to be slaughtered annually by this industry leaving their pouch young to die a barbaric, slow and painful death and their at-foot young abandoned and left to die alone from stress, starvation, dehydration, predation and exposure.” 

In the United Kingdom, the sale of kangaroo meat has prompted protests from animal welfare campaigners. German retailer Lidl announced in 2018 that it would stop selling kangaroo steaks following "customer feedback". Iceland, Tesco and Morrisons have previously stopped selling lines of kangaroo meat.

Kangatarianism
Kangatarianism is a recent practice of following a diet that cuts out meat except kangaroo on environmental and ethical grounds. Several Australian newspapers wrote about the neologism "kangatarianism" in February 2010, describing eating a vegetarian diet with the addition of kangaroo meat as a choice with environmental benefits because indigenous wild kangaroos require no extra land or water for farming and produce little methane (a greenhouse gas) unlike cattle or other farm animals. Advocates of kangatarianism also choose it because Australian kangaroos live natural lives, eat organic food, and are killed humanely. For similar reasons, Australians have discussed eating only the meat of Australian feral camels ("cameltarianism").

Name
There has been discussion from the kangaroo meat industry about attempting to introduce a specific culinary name for kangaroo meat, similar to the reference to pig meat as ham and pork, and calling deer meat venison. The motivation is to have diners thinking of the meat rather than the animal and avoiding adverse reactions to the eating of an animal considered to be cute.
In 2005 the Food Companion International magazine, with support from the Kangaroo Industry Association of Australia, ran a competition hoping to find a name that would not put diners off when they saw it on a menu.
The three-month competition attracted over 2700 entries from 41 nations, and the name australus was decided in December 2005. The name was penned by university professor Steven West, an American about to be naturalised as an Australian citizen.  Other finalists for the name included kangarly, maroo, krou, maleen, kuja, roujoe, rooviande, jurru, ozru, marsu, kep, kangasaurus, marsupan, jumpmeat, and MOM (meat of marsupials).

The competition is not binding on the Kangaroo Industry Association, which has not moved to adopt the new name in any official capacity.

Traditional Aboriginal use
Kangaroo formed an important part of many traditional Aboriginal diets.

Kangaroo is called Kere aherre by the Arrernte people of Central Australia:

You find kangaroos in flat country or mulga country.  In the old days, people used to sic their dogs on them and spear them. The milk guts are pulled out and a wooden skewer is used to close up the carcase.  Then it is tossed on top of the fire to singe the hair which is scraped off, and then it's [put in a hole and] covered up with hot earth and coals.  The tail and both feet are cut off before cooking. These are put in together with the rest of the carcase.

The kangaroo is chopped up so that many people can eat it.  The warm blood and fluids from the gluteus medius and the hollow of the thoracic cavity are drained of all fluids. People drink these fluids, which studies have shown are quite harmless.  Kangaroos are cut in a special way; into the two thighs, the two hips, the two sides of ribs, the stomach, the head, the tail, the two feet, the back and lower back.  This is the way the Arrernte people everywhere cut it up.

The Anangu, Pitjantjatjara and Yankunytjatjara peoples of Central Australia call kangaroo "malu". They use malu mainly for meat (kuka) but other uses include materials for spear making. They are an important totem species. The Angas Downs Indigenous Protected Area Rangers are currently undertaking land management activities to increase this important species in the landscape. This process is named Kuka Kanyini – looking after game animals.

See also

 Kangaroo industry
 Sustainable Wildlife Enterprises

References

External links
 Skippy Size Me 2004 ABC report on kangaroo industry
 Kangaroo Industry Association of Australia
 Greenpeace urges kangaroo consumption to fight global warming, Herald Sun
 Kangaroo Meat

Animal culling
Australian Aboriginal bushcraft
Australian cuisine
Bushfood
Macropods
Meat by animal